Kevin McKay may refer to:

 Kevin McKay (artist) (born 1966), Australian artist
 Kevin McKay (athlete) (born 1969), British track and field athlete
 Kevin McKay (musician), Scottish DJ, electronic musician, record label owner and record producer